Oosterzee-Buren is a village in Lemsterland in the province of Friesland, the Netherlands. It had a population of around 350 in 2004.

Populated places in Friesland

nl:Oosterzee-Buren